Darrell K Royal (July 6, 1924 – November 7, 2012) was an All-American football player and coach. He served as the head coach at Mississippi State University (1954–1955), the University of Washington (1956), and the University of Texas (1957–1976), compiling a career college football record of 184–60–5. In his 20 seasons at Texas, Royal's teams won three national championships (1963, 1969, and 1970), 11 Southwest Conference titles, and amassed a record of 167–47–5. He won more games than any other coach in Texas Longhorns football history. Royal also coached the Edmonton Eskimos of the Canadian Football League (CFL) for one season in 1953. He never had a losing season as a head coach for his entire career. Royal was an All-American at the University of Oklahoma, where he played football from 1946 to 1949. He was inducted into the College Football Hall of Fame as a coach in 1983. Darrell K Royal–Texas Memorial Stadium in Austin, Texas, where the Longhorns play their home games, was renamed in his honor in 1996.

Early life
"K" was Royal's given middle name, not an abbreviation. He received it in honor of his mother, Katy, who died when he was an infant. She died of cancer, but because of the stigma surrounding the disease at that time, Royal was led to believe until he was an adult that she had died giving birth to him.

Playing career
In 1942, during World War II, Royal finished Hollis High School, where he had played football. He joined the United States Army Air Corps, where he played football for the 3rd Air Force team during 1945 and was spotted and recruited by scouts for the University of Oklahoma Sooners football program. He played quarterback and defensive back at the University of Oklahoma under his mentor, coach Bud Wilkinson, from 1946 to 1949. While attending Oklahoma, he joined the Delta Upsilon fraternity.

Royal was most noted for his prowess as a defensive back, where his 18 career interceptions and his three interceptions in the 1947 game against Oklahoma A&M (now Oklahoma State) are still Sooner records.

Royal's part-time contributions as quarterback had a similar impact, despite the fact that he shared time with Jack Mitchell and Claude Arnold at the position. He threw a 43-yard pass against North Carolina in the 1949 Sugar Bowl. Royal holds the fourth-best winning percentage in school history (minimum 15 starts) with a 16–1 mark as a part-time quarterback starter. His 11–0 mark as a starter in 1949 ranks as one of the best seasons in school history.

In 1992, Royal was inducted into the Oklahoma Sports Hall of Fame.

Coaching career

Early positions
Royal served as an assistant coach at North Carolina State, Tulsa and Mississippi State. He coached the Edmonton Eskimos of the Canadian Football League, and in 1954, he returned to Mississippi State for his first collegiate head coaching job. After two seasons, he left for Washington in the Pacific Coast Conference, but stayed in Seattle for less than ten months.

University of Texas
Royal took over as head coach at the University of Texas (UT) on December 18, 1956. The team went from a 1–9 record in 1956, their worst record ever, to a 6–4–1 mark in 1957 and a berth in the Sugar Bowl. Within two years, Royal had the Longhorns in the Cotton Bowl as the number-four team in the country. In Royal's 20 years as head coach, Texas never had a losing season. Some of his most memorable games were against the Arkansas Razorbacks, and fellow College Football Hall of Fame head coach Frank Broyles.

With Royal at the helm, Texas won the school's first three national championships (1963, 1969 and 1970), won or shared 11 Southwest Conference championships, and made 16 bowl appearances.  His 1963 and 1969 teams finished the season undefeated and untied—something no Longhorn team would do again until 2005.

Royal's teams were known for being very run-oriented.  The quote, "Three things can happen when you pass, and two of them are bad," is often attributed to Royal, but Royal himself attributed it to another run-first coach, Woody Hayes.

Royal's coaching tactics were the subject of criticism in Gary Shaw's exposé of college football recruiting and coaching practices, Meat on the Hoof, which was published in 1972, six years after Shaw left the Texas football program.

Beginning in 1962, Royal also served as Texas's athletic director. He retired from coaching in 1976 and remained director of athletics until 1980. He then served as special assistant to the university president on athletic programs.

During his tenure, Royal oversaw the integration of African-Americans into the UT athletics program. At that time, while UT began admitting black students in 1956 and opening the athletics program to them in 1963, there were no black student-athletes well into the late 1960s.

In a confidential University of Texas memo dated November 10, 1959 which related to how various coaches at the university felt about black players, it was stated that "Coach Royal has coached Negro students, but says they create problems. White players particularly resented Negro boys coming in their room and lounging on their beds. Darrell was quite pronounced in not wanting any Negroes on his team until other Southwest Conference teams admit them and until the housing problem is solved or conditions change."

In 2005, Royal retrospectively noted that "things they are a-changing. But they weren't changing that quickly around here at the time." He offered a scholarship to Julius Whittier (1950-2018) of San Antonio after the last recipient dropped out due to poor academic performance, and Whittier became the first black student-athlete to play for the Texas Longhorns football team. Whittier went on to graduate from the Lyndon B. Johnson School of Public Affairs in 1976 with a master's degree and worked as a chief prosecutor with the Dallas District Attorney's Office.

Royal also coached Freddie Steinmark, who was a member of the 1969 Longhorns National Championship team and subsequently died from bone cancer.  Steinmark has been the topic of several books and a 2015 movie, My All American where Royal was portrayed by Aaron Eckhart.

In 1996, the University honored Royal by renaming Texas Memorial Stadium as Darrell K Royal–Texas Memorial Stadium. Royal was elected to the College Football Hall of Fame in 1983.

Coach Royal was famous for the inspirational Royalisms he deployed as motivational tools. These sayings include:

 "God gives talent, size, speed. But a guy can control how hard he tries."
 "I want to be remembered as a winning coach, but I also want to be remembered as an honest and ethical coach."
 "You've got to think lucky. If you fall into a mud hole, check your back pocket—you might have caught a fish."
 "Punt returns will kill you quicker than a minnow can swim a dipper."
 "Don't matter what they throw at us. Only angry people win football games."

Post-Football Life

Royal spent his retired years enjoying life with his wife, Edith, and close friends such as former president Lyndon B. Johnson and noted musician Willie Nelson. He enjoyed golfing and spending time in nature. In 1991, Royal paid $117,350 for Willie Nelson's Pedernales Country Club after it was seized by the IRS due to Nelson's tax debt. He, along with professional baseball player Pete Runnels, also helped found a co-ed summer camp, Camp Champions in Marble Falls, Texas, which is still in existence today.

Death

Royal died on November 7, 2012, due to complications of Alzheimer's disease. He is interred at the Texas State Cemetery in Austin, Texas.

Royal was survived by his wife Edith (b. 1925), whom he married on July 26, 1944. They have a son, Sammy Mack, and two predeceased children, Marian Royal Kazen (1945–73) and David Wade Royal (1952–82), both of whom died in automobile-related accidents.

Head coaching record

See also
List of presidents of the American Football Coaches Association

References

External links
 
 

1924 births
2012 deaths
American football running backs
American football quarterbacks
College football announcers
Edmonton Elks coaches
Mississippi State Bulldogs football coaches
NC State Wolfpack football coaches
Oklahoma Sooners football players
Texas Longhorns athletic directors
Texas Longhorns football coaches
Tulsa Golden Hurricane football coaches
Washington Huskies football coaches
College Football Hall of Fame inductees
United States Army Air Forces personnel of World War II
People from Hollis, Oklahoma
Coaches of American football from Oklahoma
Players of American football from Oklahoma
Burials at Texas State Cemetery
Neurological disease deaths in Texas
Deaths from Alzheimer's disease